Ryan Dillon (born May 25, 1988) is an American puppeteer who has worked as an ensemble muppeteer for the Jim Henson Company since 2005. He also played Cooper and Paul Ball for the interactive series Sesame Street TV for Xbox Kinect, and appeared on all four seasons of the new CBeebies and co-productions of Sesame Street, The Furchester Hotel, and The Not-Too-Late Show with Elmo as Elmo. In March 2017, Dillon was nominated for the Daytime Emmy Award for Outstanding Performer in Children's Programming.

Background and career
Dillon was born in Philadelphia, Pennsylvania. As a young puppeteer, Dillon came to the attention of Sesame Street producers when he went to an audition as a high school student. He took time off from school during his senior year to participate in the shooting for Season 37 in 2005. Since 2014, he has taken over performing Elmo in new productions and appearances, replacing Kevin Clash after his resignation from Sesame Street in November 2012. Ryan has also taught classes in television puppetry at Penn State, and various schools and centres in the United States. He also replaced the late Richard Hunt as Don Music in Sesame Street'''s 50th Anniversary tribute. In addition to playing Elmo, Dillon has appeared on Kraft MilkBite commercials, "Healthy Teeth, Healthy Me," "Little Children, Big Challenges," "Little Discoverers: Big Fun With Science, Math and More," Julie's Greenroom, The Muppets Take the Bowl, The Muppets Take the O2, the Nickelodeon webseries "Ask Sylvia" as the title character, and John Tartaglia's ImaginOcean'' (2010).

Filmography

Television

References

External links
 

1988 births
American male voice actors
Muppet performers
Daytime Emmy Award winners
American puppeteers
Living people
Sesame Street Muppeteers